Becoming One is the first EP released by British Metalcore band Rise To Remain. It was self-released in 2008, and is commonly known through the band's Myspace page.

Recording and Rise to Fame
In the summer of 2008, they recorded the first Rise To Remain EP, which was called ‘'Becoming One’'. Once they released the EP, the band to see their popularity grow. As a result, they started playing with much more popular bands such as The Red Shore, Shadows Fall, Five Finger Death Punch and Trivium. They also made appearances at Download Festival, and Sonisphere Festival.

Track listing

Personnel 
Rise To Remain
 Austin Dickinson – lead vocals
 Ali White  – drums
 Ben Tovey – lead guitar
 Will Homer – rhythm guitar
 Theo Tan  – bass guitar

References 

2010 EPs
Metalcore EPs
Rise to Remain albums